Blue Buck Creek is a stream off of Big Swan Creek in Hickman County, Tennessee, in the United States.

History
Blue Buck Creek was named from an incident when an early hunter killed a buck with blueish fur.

See also
List of rivers of Tennessee

References

Rivers of Hickman County, Tennessee
Rivers of Tennessee